Thubten may refer to:

Thubten Chökyi Dorje, 5th Dzogchen Rinpoche (1872–1935), the 5th Dzogchen Rinpoche of Tibet in the Nyingma sect of Tibetan Buddhism
Thubten Chodron, an American Tibetan Buddhist nun and a central figure in reinstating the Bhikshuni 
Thubten Choekyi Nyima, 9th Panchen Lama (1883–1937), the 9th Panchen Lama of Tibet
Thubten Gyatso (Australian monk), one of the first Westerners to become a monk in the Gelug school of Tibetan Buddhism
Thubten Gyatso (NKT), a 'Gen-la' and Resident Teacher of Madhyamaka Centre (Pocklington, York)
Thubten Jigme Norbu (1922–2008), a Tibetan lama, writer, civil rights activist and professor of Tibetan studies
Thubten Yeshe (1935–1984), a Tibetan lama who, while exiled in Nepal, co-founded Kopan Monastery
Thubten Zopa Rinpoche (born 1946), a lama from Thami, a village in the Khumbu region of Nepal

See also
Thubten Dhargye Ling, an American Tibetan Buddhist center founded by Geshe Gyeltsen in 1978
Thubten Shedrup Ling, the first Tibetan Buddhist monastery in Australia